The 2001–02 Oregon Ducks men's basketball team represented the University of Oregon as a member of the Pacific-10 Conference during the 2001–02 NCAA Division I men's basketball season. The team was led by head coach Ernie Kent and played their home games at McArthur Court in Eugene, Oregon. The Ducks won the Pac-10 regular season title, received an at-large bid to the NCAA tournament and made a run to the Elite Eight, and finished with a record of 26–9 (14–4 Pac-10).

Roster

Schedule and results

Rankings

NBA draft

References

Oregon Ducks
Oregon
Oregon Ducks men's basketball seasons
Oregon
Oregon